Michał Szczepaniak (born 1 August 1983) is a speedway rider from Poland.

Speedway career
He rode in the top tier of British Speedway riding for the Coventry Bees during the 2013 Elite League speedway season. He currently rides for Polonia Piła in Poland and reached the final of the 2005 Individual Speedway European Championship.

His younger brother Mateusz Szczepaniak is also a speedway rider.

References 

1983 births
Living people
Polish speedway riders
Coventry Bees riders